Ko Eun-jung (born 5 June 1996) is a South Korean biathlete. She has competed in the Biathlon World Cup, and represented South Korea at the Biathlon World Championships 2016.

References

1996 births
Living people
South Korean female biathletes
Olympic biathletes of South Korea
Biathletes at the 2018 Winter Olympics
Biathletes at the 2017 Asian Winter Games
21st-century South Korean women